Saxmen is an album by David Murray on the Red Baron label released in 1993. It features performances by Murray, John Hicks, Ray Drummond and Andrew Cyrille.

Reception
The Allmusic review by Scott Yanow awarded the album 2 stars stating "The rhythm section (pianist John Hicks, bassist Ray Drummond and drummer Andrew Cyrille) largely ignores the tenor's improvisations, making this one of David Murray's more forgettable recordings.".

Track listing
 "Lester Leaps In" (Young) 8:25
 "St. Thomas" (Rollins) - 9:11
 "Billie's Bounce" (Parker) 8:45
 "Bright Mississippi" (Monk) - 7:52
 "Broadway" (Bird, McRae, Woode) - 6:09
 "Central Park West" (Coltrane) - 12:21
Recorded August 19, 1993, in NYC

Personnel
David Murray - tenor saxophone
John Hicks - piano
Ray Drummond - bass
Andrew Cyrille - drums

References

1993 albums
David Murray (saxophonist) albums
Red Baron Records albums